Axinite is a brown to violet-brown, or reddish-brown bladed group of minerals composed of calcium aluminium boro-silicate, . Axinite is pyroelectric and piezoelectric.

The axinite group includes:
Axinite-(Fe) or ferroaxinite, Ca2Fe2+Al2BOSi4O15(OH) iron rich, clove-brown, brown, plum-blue, pearl-gray
Axinite-(Mg) or magnesioaxinite, Ca2MgAl2BOSi4O15(OH) magnesium rich, pale blue to pale violet; light brown to light pink
Axinite-(Mn) or manganaxinite, Ca2Mn2+Al2BOSi4O15(OH) manganese rich, honey-yellow, clove-brown, brown to blue
Tinzenite, (CaFe2+Mn2+)3Al2BOSi4O15(OH) iron – manganese intermediate, yellow, brownish yellow-green

Axinite is sometimes used as a gemstone.

Gallery

References

Calcium minerals
Iron(II) minerals
Manganese(II) minerals
Aluminium minerals
Sorosilicates
Triclinic minerals
Luminescent minerals
Gemstones
Minerals in space group 2